Równia pod Śnieżką (1,350–1,450 m a.s.l.) is a subalpine plateau in the Krkonoše mountains west from the peak of Sněžka. Its area is ca. 9 km2, mostly covered in bogs and marshes and clumps of Mountain Pine. Both from Polish and Czech side the plateau is limited by glacial cirques.

Tourism and hiking 
At the eastern side of the plateau there is an important junction for the main path Polish–Czech Friendship Trail. Four mountain huts in the proximity are Śląski Dom, Samotnia, Strzecha Akademicka in Poland and Luční Bouda in the Czech Republic.

References 

Plateaus of Europe
Czech Republic–Poland border
Sudetes